Lainie is a given name. Notable people with the name include:

Lainie Kazan (born 1940), American actor
Lainie Strouse (Jordan) American & European actor, producer, singer, model
Lainie Frasier, American film, television and video-game actor
Lainie Marsh, American singer-songwriter
Lainie Friedman Ross, American physician and bioethicist

See also
Lany (disambiguation)
Laney (disambiguation)
Lainey

English-language feminine given names